Subtle body is a concept in Eastern mysticism.

Subtle body may also refer to:

Body of light, a concept in Western esotericism
Causal body, a syncretic development in Theosophy
Etheric body, a syncretic development in Theosophy
Illusory body, a concept in Vajrayana Buddhism
Mental body, a syncretic development in Theosophy

See also
Astral body (disambiguation), an ambiguous term which may refer to several of the above
Okhema